criciuma
Marcelo Hermes (born 1 February 1995) is a Brazilian professional footballer who plays for Ponte Preta as a left back.

Career

Early career
Born in Sarandi, Rio Grande do Sul, Hermes started his career at a football academy in Nova Boa Vista. Shortly after, he played futsal at SERCESA of Carazinho with whom he won a state title. In 2008, Hermes joined Figueirense where he stayed one season. In 2009, he had a very quick visit to Porto Alegre side Internacional, before joining city rivals Grêmio. There he played in youth ranks until 2014.

Grêmio
At the end of 2014, Hermes was brought to Grêmio's first-team by Luiz Felipe Scolari. However, Hermes did not play any match and was only on the bench against Flamengo in Série A. It was only in 2015, after being registered in Campeonato Gaúcho, that he got his first opportunity to play. On 31 January, Hermes debuted professionally in a 3–0 home win over União Frederiquense in the league's first round.

Benfica
On 4 January 2017, Hermes signed for Portuguese champions Benfica until 2021.

Cruzeiro
In January 2019, after on year on loan with Cruzeiro from Benfica, he signed a two year contract with Cruzeiro and joined Goiás on one year loan.

Marítimo
In August 2020, Hermes signed a two year contract with Marítimo.

Honours
Benfica
Primeira Liga: 2016–17

References

External links
 

1995 births
Living people
Brazilian footballers
Association football defenders
Figueirense FC players
Sport Club Internacional players
Grêmio Foot-Ball Porto Alegrense players
S.L. Benfica B players
S.L. Benfica footballers
Cruzeiro Esporte Clube players
C.S. Marítimo players
Associação Atlética Ponte Preta players
Campeonato Brasileiro Série A players
Liga Portugal 2 players
Primeira Liga players
Brazilian expatriate footballers
Brazilian expatriate sportspeople in Portugal
Expatriate footballers in Portugal